Belverdi-ye Qadim (also Romanized as Belverdī-ye Qadīm; also known as Belverdī-ye Pā'īn and Belverdī-ye Soflá) is a village in Cham Chamal Rural District, Bisotun District, Harsin County, Kermanshah Province, Iran. At the 2006 census, its population was 40, in 10 families.

References 

Populated places in Harsin County